The Walls Came Tumbling Down is a memoir written by Henriette Roosenburg. It was published in 1957. It relates the story of her ordeals after being captured and condemned to death by Nazis, freed by invading forces, and attempting to return home. The protagonists are held as Nacht und Nebel (Night and Fog), known as NNs.

Characters
 Zip – 28-year-old female narrator, caught March 1944.
 Nell – 30, female, caught November 1943
 Joke (pronounced "Yo-kuh") – 28, female, caught May 1944
 Dries – 26, male, caught April 1944

References

World War II memoirs
1957 novels
Viking Press books